The Handball Tournament at the 2003 Pan American Games took place at Handball Hall in Santo Domingo, Dominican Republic. There was two competitions with one each for each gender. Cuba was the defending champion in the men's while Brazil were the defending champion in the women.

The tournament took place between August 2 to 11 with the winning sides of both the men’s and women’s tournament will directly qualify for the 2004 Olympic Handball Tournaments. That nation would be Brazil who would win both tournaments over Argentina.

Medal winners

Men's Competition

Preliminary round

Group A

Group B

Knockout stage

Bracket

5–8th place semifinals

Semifinals

Seventh place game

Fifth place game

Bronze medal game

Gold medal game

Ranking and statistics

Top scorers

Source: Santo Domingo 2003

Top goalkeepers
(minimum 20% of total shots received by team)

Source: Santo Domingo 2003

Women's tournament

Preliminary round

Knockout stage

Bracket

Semifinals

Fifth place game

Bronze medal game

Gold medal game

Ranking and statistics

Top scorers

Source: Santo Domingo 2003

Top goalkeepers
(minimum 20% of total shots received by team)

Source: Santo Domingo 2003

Medal table

References

 Results
 sports123

P
2003
Events at the 2003 Pan American Games
Handball in the Dominican Republic